Japaridze is a Georgian surname which may refer to:

Japaridze (noble family), a noble family in Georgia
Liza Japaridze (b. 2003), better known by the stage name "Lizi Pop"
Manana Japaridze, Georgian origin singer from Azerbaijan
Giorgi Japaridze, modern Georgian logician
Otar Japaridze (b. 1987), Georgian ice dancer
Revaz Japaridze (b. 1923), Georgian writer
Prokofy Dzhaparidze (1880-1918), Georgian Communist activist
Tedo Japaridze (b. 1946), Georgian politician
Ucha Japaridze (1906-1988), Georgian painter
 Zurab Japaridze (b. 1976), Georgian parliamentarian and leader of Girchi

See also
Anjaparidze

Georgian-language surnames
Surnames of Georgian origin